was the 19th Emperor of Japan, according to the traditional order of succession.

No firm dates can be assigned to this Emperor's life or reign, but he is conventionally considered to have reigned from 410 to 453.

Protohistoric narrative
Ingyō is regarded by historians as a "legendary Emperor" of the 5th century. 

According to Nihon Shoki, the king of the Korean Silla Kingdom grieved very much when Ingyō died. To comfort the soul of Ingyo, he presented Japan 80 musicians.

According to Kojiki and Nihon Shoki, he was the fourth son of Emperor Nintoku and his consort Princess Iwa, and therefore a younger brother of his predecessor Emperor Hanzei. He sat on the throne after Hanzei died and ruled for 41 years.

His consort was Oshisaka no Ōnakatsu no Hime. They had five sons and four daughters, including Emperor Ankō and Emperor Yūryaku. He reformed the system of family and clan names, because many named themselves false names using higher ranked clan or family names.

Known information
The earliest documented earthquake in Japan occurred during Ingyō's reign, in 416, when the Imperial Palace at Kyoto was leveled by the severity of the Earth's tremors.

Some scholars identify Ingyō with King Sai in the Book of Song. This would have been a king of Japan (referred to as Wa by contemporary Chinese scholars) who is said to have sent messengers to the Liu Song dynasty at least twice, in 443 and 451.

The actual site of Ingyō's grave is not known. The Emperor is traditionally venerated at a memorial Shinto shrine near Osaka.

Ingyō's contemporary title would not have been tennō, as most historians believe this title was not introduced until the reigns of Emperor Tenmu and Empress Jitō. Rather, it was presumably , meaning "the great king who rules all under heaven".

The Imperial Household Agency designates this location as Ingyō's mausoleum.

The reign of Emperor Kinmei ( – 571 AD), the 29th  Emperor, is the first for which contemporary historiography is able to assign verifiable dates; however, the conventionally accepted names and dates of the early Emperors were not to be confirmed as "traditional" until the reign of Emperor Kanmu (737–806), the 50th sovereign of the Yamato dynasty.

Consorts and children
Empress (Kōgō) : , Prince Wakanuke-Futamata's daughter (Emperor Ojin's son)
First Son: 
First Daughter: 
Second Son: 
Third Son: , later Emperor Ankō (401?–456)
Second Daughter: 
Fourth Son: 
Fifth Son: , later Emperor Yūryaku
Third Daughter: 
Fourth Daughter: 

Consort (Hi) : , Prince Wakanuke-Futamata's daughter (Emperor Ojin's son)

Ancestry

See also
 Imperial cult
 Five kings of Wa

Notes

References
 Aston, William George. (1896).  Nihongi: Chronicles of Japan from the Earliest Times to A.D. 697. London: Kegan Paul, Trench, Trubner.  
 Brown, Delmer M. and Ichirō Ishida, eds. (1979).  Gukanshō: The Future and the Past. Berkeley: University of California Press. ;  
 Hammer, Joshua. (2006).  Yokohama Burning: The Deadly 1923 Earthquake and Fire that Helped Forge the Path to World War II. New York: Simon & Schuster.   (cloth)
 Ponsonby-Fane, Richard Arthur Brabazon. (1959).  The Imperial House of Japan. Kyoto: Ponsonby Memorial Society. 
 Titsingh, Isaac. (1834). Nihon Ōdai Ichiran; ou,  Annales des empereurs du Japon.  Paris: Royal Asiatic Society, Oriental Translation Fund of Great Britain and Ireland.  
 Varley, H. Paul. (1980).  Jinnō Shōtōki: A Chronicle of Gods and Sovereigns. New York: Columbia University Press. ;  

 
 

Japanese emperors
People of Kofun-period Japan
5th-century monarchs in Asia
5th-century Japanese monarchs
Year of birth unknown
453 deaths